Samir Handanović (born 14 July 1984) is a Slovenian professional footballer who serves as captain and plays as a goalkeeper for  club Inter Milan.

Before moving to Italy, Handanović played in his home country of Slovenia. In 2004, he was acquired by Udinese, but spent the next few years on loan, playing for teams such as Treviso, Lazio and Rimini. Handanović returned to Udinese ahead of the 2007–08 season, where he played as a starter for the next five years. In the next season, he also played European football for the first time, making his debut in UEFA Cup. After five years as starter and more than 200 appearances, Handanović joined Inter Milan in July 2012. In February 2019, he was named club captain, while in September, he made his 300th appearance for the club, and subsequently went on to reach the 2020 UEFA Europa League Final that season. He made his 500th Serie A appearance in February 2021, and won his first trophy that May by winning the title.

Having previously represented the Slovenian under-21 team, Handanović made his senior international debut for Slovenia in 2004. He went on to earn 81 caps for his country, the most by a goalkeeper, and played for them at the 2010 FIFA World Cup.

Nicknamed Batman, due to his acrobatic saves, he is regarded as one of the best goalkeepers of his generation, and is one of only four non-Italian keepers to be named Serie A Goalkeeper of the Year, winning the honour three times. A penalty saving specialist, during the 2010–11 Serie A season he saved a total of six penalty kicks, equalling an all-time league record set in the 1948–49 season. During the 2019–20 season, he equalled Gianluca Pagliuca's record of most penalties saved in Serie A with his 24th stop. The following season, he broke the record.

Club career

Early career
Born in Ljubljana, Handanović started his career at local side Slovan. He later joined Domžale, where he made his Slovenian PrvaLiga debut in the 2003–04 season. During the same season, he was also loaned to the Slovenian Second League side Zagorje. In the summer of 2004, at the age of 20, he was signed by Serie A side Udinese. However, his first spell with the Friuliani was short-lived as he was unable to cement his place in the starting line-up. His debut occurred on 20 November 2004 in a Coppa Italia match against Lecce, where he was sent-off in 91st minute for conceding a penalty after a foul on Mirko Vučinić; since Udinese had used all three substitutions, striker David Di Michele entered in goal in his place. Vučinić, however, failed to score from the penalty spot and Udinese won 5–4. He made his Serie A debut on 15 May 2005 in a 1–1 home draw against Sampdoria.

Handanović was on loan to Treviso in the summer of 2005, but in January 2006, he was exchanged with Matteo Sereni to Lazio. With Treviso, he received his first ever red card during the match against his next club, Lazio, on 18 September 2005 in an eventual 3–1 away loss. During his time with the Biancoceleste, Handanović played three matches and conceded six goals.

On 14 May 2006, in the last day of 2005–06 season, Handanović, with the number 24, played his first and last match for Lazio, keeping a clean sheet against Parma in a 1–0 home win.

In July 2006, Handanović was loaned to Rimini, with a pre-set price of €1.2 million. Thanks also to his saves, Rimini remained undefeated in both championship games played against Juventus. The club finished fifth in Serie B and conceded the fourth fewest goals in the league. Handanović was considered the second best goalkeeper of that Serie B season, after Gianluigi Buffon. In June 2007, despite Rimini excising the option, Udinese also excised the option by paying Rimini €250,000 in net.

Return to Udinese
Handanović returned to Udinese in the summer of 2007 after Udinese excised the counter-option to reject the buying, where he replaced Morgan De Sanctis and signed a new and improved contract lasting until 30 June 2012.

2009–10 season
Despite the arrival of the Venezuelan goalie Rafael Romo, Handanović retained his spot as the number one goalkeeper. He started his fourth season as an Udinese player by featuring full-90 minutes in team's opening league match of the season, a 2–2 home draw against Parma. He kept his goal intact for the first time this season on 19 September in matchday 4 against Napoli, which ended in a goalless draw.

During the 2009–10 campaign, Handanović was the most used player on the field, collecting in total 40 appearances, including 37 in league. In Serie A, he made a total of 130 saves which were priceless for Udinese, who ended the season in 15th position.

2010–11 season
Before the start of the season, Handanović changed the squad number from 22 to 1. The squad started the 2010–11 season with four losses in its first four Serie A weeks, leaving Udinese in last place. Handanović kept his first clean sheet of the season on 26 September 2010 during a goalless draw against Sampdoria, helping the team to collect its first point of the season.

During a match against Lazio in May 2011, he saved a penalty from Mauro Zárate, his sixth saved penalty during the 2010–11 season that equaled the all-time league record set in the 1948–49 season for most penalties saved during the course of a single season. Due to his performances, he was named to the Serie A Team of the Year for 2010–11.

2011–12 season
On 16 August 2011, he played his first ever UEFA Champions League match against Arsenal, in the first leg of the play-off round, being beaten by a Theo Walcott 4th-minute goal in a 1–0 away loss at Emirates Stadium. In the returning leg at Stadio Friuli after one week, Udinese was leading after 50 minutes, but Arsenal come back to beat Handanović twice in a span of 14 minutes with Bianconeri Friuliani being eliminated with the aggregate 3–1.

Handanović kept a clean sheet in team's opening league match against Lecce, helping the team to a 2–0 away win. Udinese and Handanović were unbeaten in their first seven Serie A games, and only conceded one goal in that period, which was the best defensive record in top European leagues at the time.

Inter Milan
On 4 July 2012, Gino Pozzo, son of Udinese owner Giampaolo Pozzo, confirmed that an agreement had been reached for Handanović to join Inter Milan, with Inter paying a reported €11 million plus Davide Faraoni for his services; the transfer was made official by Inter five days later. Handanović was brought in to replace the Brazilian goalkeeper Júlio César to take over as first-choice goalkeeper. He signed a contract worth a reported €2 million per season, plus bonuses.

2012–13 season

He made his club debut on 2 August 2012, in a 3–0 win over Hajduk Split in the 2012–13 UEFA Europa League third qualifying round, then conceded two goals in the 2–0 return-leg loss at home on 2 August, but Inter advanced on a 3–2 aggregate. On 17 August, Handanović suffered a meniscus injury that delayed the start of his Serie A campaign until 16 September, in a 2–0 road win over Torino. Handanović kept crosstown rivals Milan at bay in his first Derby della Madonnina appearance on 7 October, won 1–0 by Inter. He made his 200th Serie A appearance in Inter's 2–1 home win over Napoli. Inter were held to a 1–1 draw in the second derby encounter on 25 February 2013, but Handanović was noted for performing several saves against Milan striker Mario Balotelli.

In 2012, Handanović was included for the first time in the top ten IFFHS Goalkeepers of the World, ranking eighth. After the end of 2012–13 season, thanks to his solid performances, Handanović was selected in Serie A Team of the Year for the second time in his career, being the goalkeeper with most appearances. He played 48 matches throughout the season, including 35 in Serie A and ten in the Europa League. Inter's season ended in disappointment, however, after failing to finish high in the Serie A table and the Europa League, earning a ninth-placed league finish (the worst position since the 1993–94 season), and a quarter-final exit in Europe.

On 19 June 2013 Inter acquired Handanović outright, and sold Faraoni to Udinese for undisclosed fees.

In June, it was reported that Spanish side Barcelona offered to sign Handanović for €23 million, which was rejected by Inter owner Massimo Moratti; Handanović's agent also confirmed that his client will not move to Barcelona after the Catalan club opted instead to retain their incumbent starting goalkeeper Víctor Valdés for another year.

2013–14 season

On 18 August 2013, in Mazzarri's first match in charge, Handanović was in goal and kept his first clean sheet of the season in the Coppa Italia's third round match against Cittadella, where Inter progressed to the next round thanks to a 4–0 home win.

Handanović started the league season in strong fashion, keeping three clean sheets in the first four league matches. On 20 October, during the league encounter against Torino, he received his second-ever career red card for a foul on Alessio Cerci in the 5th minute; Inter however endured and drew 3–3. On 15 December, Handanović saved his first penalty as a Nerazzurri keeper in a 4–2 away loss against Napoli, saving a Goran Pandev penalty in the second half.

During the 2013–14 season, Inter returned to European competition after a year long absence, finishing fifth in the league with 60 points. He played as a starter in Javier Zanetti's last competitive match at San Siro, in which Inter defeated Lazio 4–1 to secure a place in Europa League play-offs for the next season. Handanović managed 14 clean sheets in 36 appearances during the Serie A season, and conceded 32 goals.

2014–15 season

Inter opened the 2014–15 Serie A season with a disappointing goalless draw against Torino, with Handanović stopping a penalty kick from Marcelo Larrondo. After saving his last five Serie A penalties faced, Handanović saved from Yevhen Konoplyanka of Dnipro Dnipropetrovsk on 27 November 2014 in a game which Inter won to confirm top spot in their Europa League group with one game remaining. That was also his 100th appearance with Nerazzurri in all competitions.

Handanović played his 100th league match with Inter on 19 April 2015 in the Derby della Madonnina against Milan, keeping his goal intact as the match ended goalless. He ended his third season with Inter by playing 40 matches in all competitions, including 37 in Serie A, as Inter finished in eighth place, again failing to qualify for European competition. Handanović obtained 11 clean sheets in Serie A, the third-highest total in Serie A. Handanović also managed to have a shot-to-save ratio of better than 67 percent.

At the end of the season, it was reported that Handanović was the target of Premier League side Manchester United, but his agent turned down this opportunity by saying that his client will not move to the club.

2015–16 season
Inter Milan commenced the 2015–16 season with a 1–0 home win against Atalanta, where Handanović kept his first clean-sheet of the season. On 27 September 2015, in his 300th Serie A match, against Fiorentina, Handanović made perhaps his worst appearance by giving away a 3rd-minute penalty scored by Josip Iličić, later being beaten three times by Nikola Kalinić in an eventual 1–4 loss. The loss ended Inter's undefeated streak of the 2015–16 season. After the match, Handanović told the reporters that it was his fault for the way the match ended.

On 27 October, during the match against Bologna, Handanović made a crucial save by stopping a Mattia Destro shot in 94th minute to help Inter win 0–1 away at the Stadio Renato Dall'Ara. That was his sixth clean sheet in ten matches, and first win since one loss and three consecutive draws. He later dubbed it as his favourite save of the season. Four days later, in a match against Roma, Handanović was again decisive for his team, making nine saves, including a quadruple save in the 62nd minute, helping Inter to win the match 1–0 and to take the lead of the league with 24 points. He was selected Man of the Match for his performance.

Handanović ended 2015 with 26 decisive saves, 11 clean-sheets and only 11 goals conceded, like no other goalkeeper in Serie A. Inter also ended 2015 at the top of the league.

Handanović agreed a contract extension until 2019, which was confirmed on 5 January 2016. Handanović began the new year with a clean-sheet in the team's 0–1 away win over Empoli, making several good saves throughout the match. On 16 January 2016, during an away match against Atalanta, Handanović was awarded the Man of the Match for an "outstanding" performance, as he made some fine saves. His save in the 61st minute, where he managed to stop Luca Cigarini's effort from point-blank range with his trailing foot, was deemed "save of the season" by European media.

Inter ended the 2015–16 season in fourth position, returning in UEFA Europa League after one-year absence. Handanović managed 111 saves and 15 clean sheets in 36 appearances during the Serie A season, and conceded 34 goals. He called "a shame" the failure to secure a spot in UEFA Champions League for the next season.

2016–17 season
Handanović started his fifth Inter Milan season on 21 August in the 2–0 away lose to Chievo. He made his 150th Serie A appearance for Inter on 25 September in the 1–1 home draw against Bologna. On 2 October, during the 2–1 defeat at Roma, Handanović made several saves, including one against Edin Džeko in the 86th minute which was hailed as the "save of the year" by the media. He captained Inter for the first time on 19 February of the following year in his 193rd appearance, taking the armband following Rodrigo Palacio's substitution and keeping a clean sheet in the 1–0 win over Bologna at Stadio Renato Dall'Ara.

2017–18 season
On 1 December 2017, Handanović signed a new contract until June 2021. Eight days later, he was named Man of the Match after an impressive performance at Juventus, helping Inter to earn a goalless draw and to keep them undefeated after 16 Serie A weeks. He played his 200th Serie A match for Inter on 30 December in the goalless draw against Lazio which ended the first part of the season. Handanović's 400th overall Serie A match came on 17 April 2018, keeping a clean-sheet, his 7th in last 8 matches, in the 4–0 home win versus Cagliari in round 33. He finished 2017–18 season by being ever-present in league, playing in every minute as Inter finished fourth, meaning they will play in Champions League for the first time in six years. With 17 clean-sheets, Handanović was ranked second along with Roma's Alisson in the clean-sheets list, equaling his personal best set in 2011–12 season. He conceded only 30 goals, his lowest tally since debuting in Serie A (including seasons where he has played 30 or more games).

2018–19 season
Handanović made his Champions League debut with Inter in their opening group stage match against Tottenham Hotspur. This match was also his 250th appearance for the Nerazzurri in all competitions. In the first part of 2018–19 Serie A, he was able to collect 10 clean-sheets in 19 matches, most than any other goalkeeper in the league, and second only behind Liverpool's Alisson in Europe top five leagues; in addition, he also had 4th best save success rate.

On 13 February 2019, Inter announced via their official Twitter account that Handanović has been named new team captain, replacing Mauro Icardi. On 7 March, in the 0–0 draw against Eintracht Frankfurt in the first leg of 2018–19 UEFA Europa League round of 16, Handanović kept his 100th clean sheet on his 281st official appearance for the Nerazzurri. As the season progressed, Handanović reached another landmark, as the clean sheet he achieved in the 4–0 away win against Genoa, the first since December 2011, was his 150th in Serie A.

In the final match of the championship, he played a vital role in Inter's 2–1 home win over Empoli, making two decisive stoppage time saves to deny the visitors the equaliser. His saves proved decisive for Inter, who earned another Champions League spot for the next season while Empoli was relegated back to Serie B. Before the match, he was awarded the inaugural Lega Serie A Best Goalkeeper award for the first time in his career. Handanović concluded his seventh season at Inter by being ever-present in league, playing in all 38 matches and keeping 17 clean-sheets, more than any other goalkeeper. With 17 clean-sheets, he also equalled the club's all-time record for most clean-sheets in a single Serie A season, which had previously been set by Júlio César in the 2009–10 Treble-winning season.

2019–20 season

Handanović begun his first full season as Inter captain on 26 August 2019 by keeping a clean-sheet in the 4–0 home win over newly promoted side Lecce; by doing so, he achieved his 200th Serie A victory. On 25 September, he made his 300th appearance for the club in a 1–0 home win against Lazio, the fifth in five matches, also making three important saves in the first half. His performance in the match earned the praise of the team's manager Antonio Conte, who said that Handanović "made the difference".

In the match-day seven encounter against rivals and title favourites Juventus, Handanović made his 450th appearance in Serie A (182 for Udinese, 3 for Treviso, 1 for Lazio, and 264 for Inter) as Inter suffered a 2–1 defeat at San Siro, losing the top spot in the league to the Turin side. Later that month, he was nominated for the inaugural Lev Yashin award, the Ballon d'Or of goalkeepers. His first UEFA Champions League clean-sheet of his career came on 23 October, in a 2–0 home win over German side Borussia Dortmund, in the third group match of the competition.

In December, Handanović won the AIC Serie A Goalkeeper of the Year Award for the third time in his career. On 6 December, in the goalless draw against Roma, Handanović reached another milestone, as his clean-sheet in the match was his 100th in Serie A for Inter. On 11 January 2020, he saved a penalty against Luis Muriel in a 1–1 home draw against Atalanta; this was his 24th penalty save in Serie A, which saw him equal Pagluca's record of the most penalties saved in Serie A. On 21 August, he started in Inter's 3–2 defeat to Sevilla in the 2020 UEFA Europa League Final.

2020–21 season
On 17 October 2020, Handanović overtook Pagliuca's record with his 25th penalty save in Serie A when saved a spot kick from Zlatan Ibrahimović, who went on to score from the rebound, in a 2–1 defeat against rivals Milan. He made his 500th Serie A appearance on 14 February 2021, in a 3–1 home win over Lazio, which allowed Inter to climb to the top of the league table; he became only the 15th player ever to achieve this milestone. On 2 May the club won the title for the first time since 2010, the first trophy of his career. On 23 May, in Inter's final league match of the season against Udinese, he made his 329th Serie A appearance for the club, overtaking Walter Zenga as the goalkeeper with the most appearances in the Italian top flight for Inter.

2021–22 season
On 21 September 2021, Handanović made two decisive first half saves in the away match against Fiorentina, with Inter winning 3–1 after conceding initially; this was the 1,500th win in the Serie A for the Nerazzurri. Later on, he made his 400th appearance for the club in all competitions in a 3–1 home win over Sheriff Tiraspol in the Champions League group stage, becoming the only goalkeeper to do so. On 12 January 2022, Handanović won his second career trophy, the Supercoppa Italiana, as Inter defeated Juventus 2–1 at San Siro thanks to a 120th minute winner of Alexis Sánchez.

International career

Debut and the first years

Handanović made his debut for Slovenia on 17 November 2004 in a friendly match against Slovakia, which ended in a goalless draw. Handanović was a regular member of the team during the 2006 FIFA World Cup qualifying campaign, being used mostly as a back-up for the veteran Borut Mavrič. However, in the second part of the qualifiers, he managed to play four matches, first being the 1–1 home draw against Belarus on 30 March 2005, failing to keep a clean-sheet, as Slovenia finished the Group 5 in fourth position with twelve points, failing to secure a spot in the final tournament. Lost 2 goals in the lost final of Cyprus International Football Tournaments 2006 from Romania.

On 26 May 2008, Handanović captained Slovenia for the first time in his 23rd cap during the friendly match against Sweden, who won the match at Gamla Ullevi thanks to a Tobias Linderoth goal.

Ahead of UEFA Euro 2008 qualifying, Handanović was again the second-choice, with Borut Mavrič retained his spot. He played only in the first three qualifying matches, before retiring from the national team. Handanović was successful in his first qualifying match, as Slovenia earned a goalless draw away against Albania. He played in the remaining eight matches, keeping his goal intact in three of them, as Slovenia ended its qualifying campaign in the penultimate spot with eleven points.

2010 World Cup, Euro 2016 qualifying and retirement
Handanović was ever-presented in the 2010 FIFA World Cup qualifying, playing every single minute of the qualifying campaign. Slovenia began the qualifiers with a 1–1 away draw against Poland, where Handanović was beaten in 17th minute to a Michał Żewłakow penalty kick.

In May 2010, Handanović was named in Slovenia's final list of 23 players to represent the country at the 2010 FIFA World Cup. Slovenia was placed in Group C with Algeria, England and the United States. In the team's opening match against Algeria, Handanović debuted for the first time in a major tournament, keeping a clean sheet as Slovenia managed to win 1–0 at Peter Mokaba Stadium to grab their first three points. In the next match, against the U.S. at Ellis Park Stadium, Slovenia was leading 2–0 at half time, but in the second half Handanović was beaten by Landon Donovan and Michael Bradley, with the match finishing 2–2. Slovenia were eliminated from the tournament after finishing third in their group with four points, behind the U.S. and England, following a 1–0 defeat to the latter side in their final first–round match at Nelson Mandela Bay Stadium on 23 June.

On 18 November 2015, Handanović announced his retirement from the national team after Slovenia failed to qualify for UEFA Euro 2016, crashing out with a 3–1 aggregate defeat to Ukraine in the play-offs. Handanović ended his eleven-year international career with 81 caps for Slovenia, being the most capped goalkeeper and one of the most capped players of all time; his starting position was taken over by Jan Oblak.

Style of play
 Despite his large stature and imposing physique, which make him effective at handling crosses and a commanding presence inside the box, Handanović is an extremely agile and athletic goalkeeper, who is renowned in particular for his outstanding reflexes, acrobatic saves and excellent shot-stopping abilities, as well as his positional sense, leadership, and ability to organise his defence. Although he was not initially known for being particularly adept with the ball at his feet, during his time under managers Roberto Mancini and Luciano Spalletti, he was also able to improve his ability to play out and start attacks from the back, and successfully adapted to the team's more patient build-up play, while also allowing the team to maintain a high line; his change in playing style also continued under Inter's subsequent manager Antonio Conte, under whom he further developed his control and distribution of the ball, and often acted as a sweeper-keeper.

Regarded as one of the best goalkeepers in Europe and Italy due to his performances, he is also known for his speed off his line and anticipation as a goalkeeper, which enables him to clear the ball away from danger, as well as his ability to get to ground quickly to parry or collect the ball, attributes which also make him particularly adept at stopping spot-kicks. As a result, he has developed a reputation as an exceptional penalty-kick saving specialist, having stopped an Italian record of six consecutive penalties between 2013 and 2015.

With 26 saves, he holds the record of most penalties stopped in Serie A, ahead of Gianluca Pagliuca, although Handanović has a superior success rate. Former Inter goalkeeper Giuliano Sarti has also praised Handanović for his consistency. In a 2016 interview, Handanović stated that his main influences as a goalkeeper were his cousin Jasmin Handanović and Peter Schmeichel. In 2020, Pasquale Marino described Handanović as "one of the best goalkeepers in the world."

Personal life 
Handanović is of Bosniak origin. His parents were originally from the Bosnian town of Sanski Most. His elder cousin, Jasmin Handanović, also embarked on a career in Italy from 2007 to 2011 and was also a member of the Slovenian national team. Handanović's son, named Alen, was born on 19 January 2011 to Zoja Trobec, former KK Olimpija cheerleader, who were in a long-standing relationship; the pair married in May 2012 and Handanović thus became brother-in-law to Zoja's sister Irena who is married to professional Bosnian basketball player Jasmin Hukić. On 3 October 2013, Handanović's wife gave birth to the couple's second son, named Ian.

Career statistics

Club

International

Honours
Inter Milan
Serie A: 2020–21
Coppa Italia: 2021–22
Supercoppa Italiana: 2021, 2022
UEFA Europa League runner-up: 2019–20

Individual
 Slovenian Footballer of the Year: 2009, 2011, 2012
 Serie A Team of the Year: 2010–11, 2012–13, 2018–19
 AIC Serie A Goalkeeper of the Year: 2011, 2013, 2019
 Lega Serie A Goalkeeper of the Year: 2018–19
 UEFA Europa League Squad of the Season: 2019–20

References

External links

 
 
 
 Player profile at NZS 
 
 
 

1984 births
Living people
Slovenian people of Bosniak descent
Slovenian people of Bosnia and Herzegovina descent
Footballers from Ljubljana
Slovenian footballers
Association football goalkeepers
NK Domžale players
NK Zagorje players
Udinese Calcio players
Treviso F.B.C. 1993 players
S.S. Lazio players
Rimini F.C. 1912 players
Inter Milan players
Slovenian PrvaLiga players
Slovenian Second League players
Serie A players
Serie B players
Slovenia youth international footballers
Slovenia under-21 international footballers
Slovenia international footballers
2010 FIFA World Cup players
Slovenian expatriate footballers
Slovenian expatriate sportspeople in Italy
Expatriate footballers in Italy